The 2019–20 Sydney Sixers Women's season was the fifth in the team's history. Coached by Ben Sawyer, they finished fifth in WBBL05. The Sixers entered the tournament as "hot favourites" and proceeded to win six of their first eight matches. However, after captain Ellyse Perry sustained a shoulder injury, they lost five consecutive games to miss out on qualifying for finals for the first time.

Squad 
Each 2019–20 squad featured 15 active players, with an allowance of up to five marquee signings including a maximum of three from overseas. Australian marquees are players who held a national women's team contract at the time of signing on for their WBBL|05 team.

South African Marizanne Kapp returned for the Sixers to become one of only two foreigners, along with New Zealander Sophie Devine (member of the Adelaide Strikers), to play in each of the first five WBBL seasons with one team.

On 19 November, the Sixers announced the signing of Englishwoman Hollie Armitage, replacing captain Ellyse Perry who would miss five games due to a shoulder injury. Alyssa Healy stood in as acting captain in the absence of Perry.

The table below lists the Sixers players and their key stats (including runs scored, batting strike rate, wickets taken, economy rate, catches and stumpings) for the season.

Ladder

Fixtures 

All times are local time

Statistics and awards 

 Most runs: Ellyse Perry – 469 (6th in the league)
 Highest score in an innings: Alyssa Healy – 106* (53) vs Melbourne Stars, 3 November
 Most wickets: Marizanne Kapp – 15 (equal 11th in the league)
 Best bowling figures in an innings: Erin Burns – 3/5 (2 overs) vs Hobart Hurricanes, 13 November
 Most catches (fielder): Erin Burns – 7 (equal 9th in the league)
 Player of the Match awards:
 Ellyse Perry – 3
 Alyssa Healy – 2
 Marizanne Kapp, Dane van Niekerk – 1 each
 Sixers Player of the Tournament: Marizanne Kapp
 WBBL|05 Player of the Tournament: Ellyse Perry (equal 4th)
 WBBL|05 Team of the Tournament: Marizanne Kapp, Ellyse Perry
 WBBL|05 Young Gun Award: Stella Campbell (nominated)

References 

2019–20 Women's Big Bash League season by team
Sydney Sixers (WBBL)